, provisional designation , is a stony Nysian asteroid from the inner region of the asteroid belt, approximately  in diameter. It was discovered on 22 August 1990, by American astronomer Henry Holt at the Palomar Observatory in California. The likely elongated S-type asteroid has a rotation period of 3.53 hours. This asteroid has not been named.

Orbit and classification 

 is member of the Nysa family, located in the Nysa–Polana complex. It is named after 44 Nysa and one of the largest families in the main belt.

The asteroid orbits the Sun in the inner asteroid belt at a distance of 1.9–2.9 AU once every 3 years and 8 months (1,344 days; semi-major axis of 2.38 AU). Its orbit has an eccentricity of 0.22 and an inclination of 2° with respect to the ecliptic. The body's observation arc begins at Palomar with its official discovery observation in 1990.

Physical characteristics 

 has been characterized as a common, stony S-type asteroid by Pan-STARRS survey and in the SDSS-based taxonomy.

Rotation period 

Lightcurve analysis gave a well-defined rotation period of 3.5257 hours with a high brightness variation of 0.77 magnitude. In January 2014, observations in the R-band at the Palomar Transient Factory in California gave two concurring periods of 3.523 and 3.53 hours with an amplitude of 0.60 magnitude. A high brightness amplitude typically indicates that the body has a non-spherical shape

Diameter and albedo 

According to the survey carried out by the NEOWISE mission of NASA's Wide-field Infrared Survey Explorer,  measures 3.345 kilometers in diameter and its surface has an albedo of 0.250. The Collaborative Asteroid Lightcurve Link adopts Petr Pravec's revised WISE-result, that is, an albedo of 0.2232 and a diameter of 3.351 kilometers based on an absolute magnitude of 14.62.

Naming 

This minor planet was numbered on 2 February 1999. As of 2018, it has not been named.

References

External links 
 Asteroid Lightcurve Database (LCDB), query form (info )
 Discovery Circumstances: Numbered Minor Planets (5001)-(10000) – Minor Planet Center
 
 

009948
Discoveries by Henry E. Holt
009948
19900822